The following outline is provided as an overview of and topical guide to Nunavut:

Nunavut is the largest and newest territory of Canada. It was officially separated from the Northwest Territories via the Nunavut Act to provide the Inuit of the region a degree of self-government. Iqaluit is the capital and largest city.

Geography of Nunavut

Geography of Nunavut
 Nunavut is: a territory of Canada
 Location:
 The regions in which Nunavut is located are:
 Northern Hemisphere, Western Hemisphere
 Americas
 North America
 Northern America
 Canada
 Eastern Canada
 Extreme points of Nunavut
 Population of Nunavut:
 Area of Nunavut:
 Atlas of Nunavut

Environment of Nunavut 

 Protected areas of Nunavut
 Historic places in Nunavut
 National Historic Sites of Canada in Nunavut

Natural geographic features of Nunavut 
 Lakes in Nunavut
 Rivers in Nunavut

Regions of Nunavut 
 Communities in Nunavut
 Municipalities in Nunavut

Demographics of Nunavut 
 Demographics of Nunavut

Government and politics of Nunavut
 Elections of Nunavut
 General elections of Nunavut
 Political parties in Nunavut

Government of Nunavut

Executive branch of the government of Nunavut 
 Premier of Nunavut
 Premiers of Nunavut
 Commissioner of Nunavut
 Executive Council of Nunavut

Legislative branch of the government of Nunavut 
 Nunavut Legislative Assembly

Judicial branch of the government of Nunavut 
 Nunavut Court of Justice
 Nunavut Court of Appeal

Law of Nunavut 
 Same-sex marriage in Nunavut

History of Nunavut

 History of Nunavut

Culture of Nunavut

 Museums in Nunavut
 Music of Nunavut
 People of Nunavut
 List of people from Nunavut
 Religion in Nunavut
 Christianity in Nunavut
 Diocese of the Arctic
 Scouting and Guiding in Nunavut
 Symbols of Nunavut
 Coat of arms of Nunavut
 Flag of Nunavut

Economy and infrastructure of Nunavut

 Communication in Nunavut
 Radio stations in Nunavut
 Television transmitters in Nunavut
 Energy in Nunavut
 Electricity generating stations in Nunavut
 Transport in Nunavut
 Air transport in Nunavut
 Airports in Nunavut
 Vehicular transport in Nunavut
 Vehicle registration plates of Nunavut
 Road system in Nunavut
 Territorial highways of Nunavut

Education in Nunavut

 List of schools in Nunavut
 Museums in Nunavut
 Higher education in Nunavut

References

External links

 

Nunavut
Nunavut
 1